The following tables present the ranks and insignia of the Sri Lanka Navy. These ranks are similar to Royal Naval officer ranks and the ratings ranks. Sri Lanka does have an Admiral rank, but it is usually only awarded to the Chief of Defence Staff (CDS) or as an honorary rank; Admiral Wasantha Karannagoda was the only Sri Lankan naval officer to hold a full admiral rank while in active service.

Officer ranks 

Admiral of the Fleet is the highest rank in the Sri Lanka Navy and has been awarded only once, to Wasantha Karannagoda as an honorary rank. It is equivalent to Field Marshal in the Army and Marshal of the Sri Lanka Air Force in the Air Force.
Admiral is the four-star rank of the Sri Lankan Navy. The rank of full admiral is not always given; this rank is held by a Chief of the Defence Staff (if the chief is appointed from the navy and not from the army or the air force) or is mostly awarded as a ceremonial rank to the Commander of the Navy on his day of retirement. It is the equivalent of General in the Sri Lanka Army and Air Chief Marshal in the Sri Lanka Air Force.
Vice admiral is a three-star rank of the Sri Lankan Navy. The rank of Vice admiral is held by the Commander of the Sri Lanka Navy. It is equivalent to Lieutenant general in the Sri Lanka Army and Air marshal in the Sri Lanka Air Force.
Rear admiral is a two-star rank of the Sri Lankan Navy. It is equivalent to Major general in the Sri Lanka Army and Air vice marshal in the Sri Lanka Air Force.
Commodore is a one-star rank of the Sri Lankan Navy. It is equivalent to Brigadier in the Sri Lanka Army and Air commodore in the Sri Lanka Air Force.
Captain is an officer in the Sri Lanka Navy. The rank has a NATO rank code of OF-5, equivalent to colonel in the Sri Lanka Army and group captain in the Sri Lanka Air Force.

Branch 
Officers are assigned to a branch of the service based on their specialization. Officers of non-executive branches wear a distinction cloth worn between the stripes of a particular colour (with the exception of the Band and Provost branch):

 Scarlet - Engineering 
 Orange – Medical
 White - Logistics 
 Dark green - Electrical 
 Silver grey - Shipwrights
 Blue - Information Technology
 Brown - Naval Patrolman 
 Purple - Legal

Other ranks

Trade branch of sailors

 Quarter Master
 Radar Plotter
 Survey Recorder
 Gunnery Rate
 Under Water Weaponriter 
 Diver
 Patrolman
 Physical Training Instructor
 Engineering Mechanic 
 Tradesman
 Civil Engineering 

 Hull Engineering 
 Transport Assistant
 Electrician Mate
 Radio Electrician Mate
 Steward
 Chef
 Information Technology
 Writer
 Stores Assistant
 Communicator 
 Medical Assistant 
 Musician

See also 
 Sri Lanka Army ranks and insignia
 Sri Lanka Air Force ranks and insignia
 Sri Lanka Coast Guard#Rank structure

References

External links 
 Sri Lanka Navy
 Ministry of Defence, Public Security, Law & Order - Democratic Socialist Republic of Sri Lanka
 Sri Lanka Navy, Branches / Ranks

Sri Lanka Army
 Sri Lanka Navy
Ranks and insignia